Lydia Haase (born 7 September 1986) is a former German field hockey player, who played as a forward.

Personal life
Lydia Haase was born and raised in Leipzig.

Haase works as a teacher at Baulandschule Hettingen, an elementary school in Buchen.

Career

Under–21
In 2006, Haase was a member of the Germany U–21 team at the EuroHockey Junior Championship in Catania. At the tournament, Germany won a gold medal.

Die Danas
Haase made her senior debut for Germany in 2009, during a test match in South Africa. Later that year she also represented the team at 2009 Women's Hockey Champions Trophy in Sydney.

Throughout her career, Haase appeared represented Germany at four European Championships. She medalled in each tournament, winning a gold medal in 2013, silver in 2009 and 2011, as well as bronze in 2015.

References

1986 births
Living people
German female field hockey players
Female field hockey forwards
Mannheimer HC players
Feldhockey Bundesliga (Women's field hockey) players
Sportspeople from Leipzig
21st-century German women